Broken Walrus II, is a public sculpture by American artist Gary Freeman, created in 1976 and located at the Indianapolis Museum of Art, which is near Indianapolis, Indiana, United States. It is made of mild steel and is approximately 84 x 84 x 276 inches. The sculpture has been described by Freeman as looking like a grasshopper.

Information
Broken Walrus II was originally commissioned by Robert Borns of Borns Management for a sculpture garden at the Northern Indianapolis apartment complex Pickwick Place. In 1995 the sculpture was given to the Indianapolis Museum of Art, where it remained for over ten years before it was deaccessioned and disassembled in December 2008.

See also
 Broken Walrus I

References

External links
Save Outdoor Sculpture!

Outdoor sculptures in Indianapolis
Culture of Indianapolis
Sculptures of the Indianapolis Museum of Art
1976 sculptures
Steel sculptures in Indiana